Adam Font, Mayor of Galway, 1524-25.

Font was town bailiff in 1509. It was during his term of office that peace terms in a trade war between Limerick and Galway were reached. He was the second of three members of the Font family to become mayor.

See also

 Tribes of Galway

References
 History of Galway, James Hardiman, Galway, 1820.
 Old Galway, Maureen Donovan O'Sullivan, 1942.
 Henry, William (2002). Role of Honour: The Mayors of Galway City 1485-2001. Galway: Galway City Council.  
 Martyn, Adrian (2016). The Tribes of Galway: 1124-1642

Mayors of Galway
Politicians from County Galway